Huw Nightingale (born 12 November 2001) is a British snowboarder, competing in the snowboard cross discipline. He was named to Great Britain's 2022 Winter Olympics team.

References

External links
 Huw Nightingale at FIS

2001 births
Living people
Snowboarders at the 2022 Winter Olympics
British male snowboarders
Olympic snowboarders of Great Britain
21st-century British people